is a variety of cheese typical of the Sila area in the region of Calabria in Italy.

Characteristics 
Provola Silana is a semi-hard stretched curd cheese obtained thanks to the processing of cow's milk, coming from the various cattle breeds raised in the area and is distinguished by its typical shape defined as oval or truncated cone.

It has a thin and very homogeneous crust, rather smooth and with a yellow color. Internally the texture is homogeneous to compact, with white or very light yellow holes that become more intense as the inside of the cheese is reached.

It is produced following the ancient processing methods within the territory surrounding the Sila mountains - between 900 and 1400 meters above sea level - between the provinces of Cosenza, Crotone and Catanzaro, and more precisely between the municipalities of San Giovanni in Fiore, Pedace, Spezzano della Sila, Longobucco, Serra Pedace and Castelsilano.

Preparation 
Freshly milked raw milk is filtered and rennet is added. It is then coagulated at a temperature of about 37 °C. Once firm, the clot is broken in order to obtain six small granules and the curd is heated up to 40-45 °C. After heating, the curd is kept stirred to favor dehydration and is left to settle on the bottom. At this point the curd is extracted, left to rest for a few days and then spun: the forms thus obtained are finally immersed in cold water to favor their firming.

See also
 List of Italian cheeses
 Cuisine of Calabria
 List of Italian dishes

References 

Cuisine of Calabria
Cheese
Italian cheeses